Renate Gebhard (born 2 May 1977, Bolzano, Italy) is an Italian jurist and politician of South Tyrolean People's Party (SVP). She is a current member of the Italian Chamber of Deputies.

Early life and education 
She attended high school in Bolzano and later studied law at the University of Innsbruck and Padua. She graduated in 2002 and by 2006 she worked as a lawyer in Bolzano.

Political career 
In 2005 she was elected into the municipal council of Klausen and in 2013 assumed as a member of the Italian Parliament representing Trentino-Alto Adige for the SVP.

Political positions 
Since 2014 she is the spokesperson for the SVP women and as such draws attention to issues such as Equal Pay Day and gender equality. During the pandemic of Covid she positioned herself in favor of an organized education and the reopening of schools.

References 

Italian jurists
21st-century Italian women politicians
South Tyrolean People's Party politicians
Deputies of Legislature XVII of Italy
Deputies of Legislature XVIII of Italy
Living people
1977 births
Politicians from Bolzano
Germanophone Italian people
Deputies of Legislature XIX of Italy
Women members of the Chamber of Deputies (Italy)